The Lélé or Lété is a river of Cameroon, in the south of the country.

References
 

Rivers of Cameroon